Valentina Kharchenko (née Zolotykh; born 1949) is a Russian female former track and field athlete who competed in the discus throw for the Soviet Union. This ranked her third in the world for that season behind East Germany's Evelin Jahl and Bulgarian Maria Petkova. She ranked in the all-time top five at that point, behind Jahl, Petkova and Soviet record holder Faina Melnik, and as of 2018 this mark continues to rank her in the all-time top 30 female discus throwers. She competed between 1977 and 1982 and was also ranked eleventh in the world for the 1978 and 1982 seasons.

References

External links

Living people
1949 births
Soviet female discus throwers
Russian female discus throwers